Eumesosoma is a genus of harvestmen in the family Sclerosomatidae from the United States.

Species
 Eumesosoma arnetti J. C. Cokendolpher, 1980
 Eumesosoma iranus Roewer
 Eumesosoma nigrum (Say, 1821)
 Eumesosoma ocalensis J. C. Cokendolpher, 1980
 Eumesosoma roeweri (C.J.Goodnight & M.L.Goodnight, 1943)
 Eumesosoma sayi J. C. Cokendolpher, 1980

References

Harvestmen